The WN postcode area, also known as the Wigan postcode area, is a group of eight postcode districts in North West England, within three post towns. These cover most of the Metropolitan Borough of Wigan in Greater Manchester (including Wigan itself and Leigh), plus small parts of West Lancashire (including Skelmersdale) and the Metropolitan Borough of St Helens in Merseyside.



Coverage
The approximate coverage of the postcode districts:

|-
! WN1
| WIGAN
| Haigh, Ince, Swinley, Wigan
| Wigan
|-
! WN2
| WIGAN
| Abram, Aspull, Bamfurlong, Bickershaw, Haigh, Hindley, Hindley Green, Ince, Platt Bridge
| Wigan
|-
! WN3
| WIGAN
| Goose Green, Ince, Winstanley, Worsley Mesnes, Hawkley Hall
| Wigan
|-
! WN4
| WIGAN
| Ashton-in-Makerfield, Garswood
| Wigan, St Helens
|-
! WN5
| WIGAN
| Billinge, Newtown, Higher End, Orrell, Pemberton, Winstanley, Worsley Hall, Marsh Green.
| Wigan, St Helens
|-
! WN6
| WIGAN
| Appley Bridge, Beech Hill, Shevington, Springfield, Standish, Wrightington
| Wigan, West Lancashire
|-
! WN7
| LEIGH
| Leigh, Hope Carr, Landside, Low Common, Bedford, Westleigh, Pennington, Higher Folds
| Wigan
|-
!rowspan=2|WN8
| WIGAN
| Dalton,  Newburgh, Parbold
|rowspan=2|West Lancashire
|-
| SKELMERSDALE
| Chapel House, Holland Moor, Roby Mill, Skelmersdale, Up Holland 
|}

Map

See also
Postcode Address File
List of postcode areas in the United Kingdom

References

External links
Royal Mail's Postcode Address File
A quick introduction to Royal Mail's Postcode Address File (PAF)

Metropolitan Borough of Wigan
Metropolitan Borough of St Helens
Borough of West Lancashire
Postcode areas covering North West England